KRXR (1480 AM) is a radio station  broadcasting a Regional Mexican format. Licensed to Gooding, Idaho, United States, the station serves the Twin Falls area. The station is currently owned by Maria Elena Juarez.

The format is simulcast on KDIL 940 AM & 94.3 FM (translator).

History
The station was assigned the call letters KIDI on April 24, 1985. On May 9, 1986, the station changed its call sign to the current KRXR.

References

External links
Radio Fiesta La 1480 - 101.3 Facebook

RXR
Regional Mexican radio stations in the United States